Harry A. Readshaw III (born August 17, 1941) is a retired American politician. He was a Democratic member of the Pennsylvania House of Representatives for the 36th District from 1994 until 2020.  He and his wife live in Pittsburgh, Pennsylvania, and have three children. He graduated from Carrick High School in 1959 and attended Duquesne University from 1959 to 1962. He graduated from the Pittsburgh Institute of Mortuary Science in 1962. Prior to elective office, he served in the United States Marine Corps Reserve and in the Carrick Community Council. He has been a funeral director since 1970.

References

External links
Pennsylvania House of Representatives - Harry Readshaw (Democrat) official PA House website
Pennsylvania House Democratic Caucus - Representative Harry Readshaw official Party website

1941 births
Living people
Democratic Party members of the Pennsylvania House of Representatives
Businesspeople from Pittsburgh
Military personnel from Pittsburgh
American funeral directors
21st-century American politicians